The Journal of Accounting Research is a leading peer-reviewed academic journal associated with the University of Chicago. It was established in 1963 and is published by Wiley-Blackwell on behalf of the Accounting Research Center (Formerly the Institute of Professional Accounting) at the University of Chicago Booth School of Business.

Its current senior editors are Philip G. Berger, Luzi Hail, Christian Leuz, Haresh Sapra, Douglas J. Skinner, Rodrigo Verdi, and  Regina Wittenberg Moerman.

It is listed as one of the 50 journals used by the Financial Times to compile its business-school research ranks and Bloomberg Businessweek'''s Top 20 Journals. According to the Journal Citation Reports'', it has a 2018 impact factor of 4.891, ranking it third out of 103 journals in the category "Business, Finance".

Former Editors 

 Sidney Davidson
 David O. Green
Nicholas Dopuch
Katherine Schipper
 Richard Leftwich
 Abbie J. Smith
Ray Ball
 Merle Erickson

References

External links
 

Wiley-Blackwell academic journals
English-language journals
Publications established in 1963
Accounting journals
Accounting research
5 times per year journals